Megachoriolaus texanus is a species of flower longhorn in the beetle family Cerambycidae. It is found in North America.

References

Further reading

 
 

Lepturinae
Articles created by Qbugbot
Beetles described in 1941
Beetles of North America